Montenegro competed at the 2020 Summer Paralympics in Tokyo, Japan, from 24 August to 5 September 2021.

Medalists

Competitors

Athletics

Montenegro entered two athletes into the athletics competition at the games.

Men
Field

Women
Field

Swimming

Montenegro entered one athlete into the swimming competition at the games.

Men

Table tennis

Montenegro entered one athletes into the table tennis competition at the games. Filip Radović qualified via World Ranking allocation.

Men

References 

Nations at the 2020 Summer Paralympics
2020
2021 in Montenegrin sport